Srikrishna Dutt Paliwal  ( b 1898, d 22 Jul 1968 ) was a politician from Indian State of Uttar Pradesh.

He represent Uttar Pradesh State in Rajya Sabha, the Council of States of India parliament during 1967 to 1968. 

He was arrested in 1942 by British government, along with other congressmen.

References

1898 births
1968 deaths
Rajya Sabha members from Uttar Pradesh